An expression language is a language for creating a computer-interpretable representation of specific knowledge and may refer to:

Advanced Boolean Expression Language, an obsolete hardware description language for hardware descriptions
Data Analysis Expressions (DAX), an expression language developed by Microsoft and used in Power Pivot, among other places
Jakarta Expression Language, a domain-specific language used in Jakarta EE web applications. Formerly known as "Unified Expression Language", "Expression Language"  or just "the Expression Language").
Rights Expression Languages, machine processable language used for representing immaterial rights such as copyright and license information